"Only You" is a song by English synth-pop duo Yazoo. It was written by member Vince Clarke, while he was still with Depeche Mode, but recorded in 1982 after he formed Yazoo with Alison Moyet. It was released as Yazoo's first single on 15 March 1982 in the United Kingdom, taken from their first album, Upstairs at Eric's (1982), and became an instant success on the UK Singles Chart, peaking at number two on 16 May 1982. It would also reach the top 10 in neighbouring Ireland as well as Australia. In the US, "Only You" was released as the band's second single in November 1982 and charted at number 67 on the Billboard Hot 100. It also made the Billboard Adult Contemporary chart (number 38).

A remix of "Only You" made the UK top 40 again in 1999, while reaching number 16 on the US Billboard Hot Dance Music/Club Play chart. The music video for the new version was created using the Houdini 3D animation software package.

In September 2015, Moyet performed "Only You" as part of a four-song set at the Burberry Woman's Spring/Summer 2016 Collection Fashion Show in London. The performance was later released on Alison Moyet – Live for Burberry EP. Audience members included Anna Wintour, Benedict Cumberbatch, Paloma Faith and Kate Moss. The performance featured a live orchestra as accompaniment.

An orchestral remix of "Only You" was created for the Boots 2017 Christmas advert on British TV. Yazoo released the track on their YouTube channel on 17 November 2017, promising that it would be released as a single-track download the following week. The remix features Moyet's original vocal with a brand new orchestral backing track.

The Flying Pickets recorded an a cappella cover of "Only You" which was the Christmas number one in the UK in December 1983. It also reached number 17 in Canada in April 1984.

Becky Hill has released a stripped-back version which features in the McDonald’s Christmas Advert  in 2022. 
10 pence from every download of Hill’s ‘Only You’ (From The McDonald’s Christmas Advert 2022) in the UK from now until Spring 2023 will be donated to BBC Children in Need.
The track went on to become Hill’s 10th Top 40 record and has accumulated over 9.9 million streams to date.

Recording
In 1981, English musician Vince Clarke left the electronic band Depeche Mode, citing touring fatigue and disdain for pop stardom as his reasons for the departure. Clarke was worried Mute Records would drop him as a result, and decided to write for the label a song called "Only You". Clarke originally wrote the music for the song on a guitar, and transposed the riff into synthesizer notes. While writing the lyrics, Clarke remarked "It was a very simple arrangement. I just formed words on a piece of paper. I was just hoping Daniel Miller, Mute Records founder, would like it". Before Clarke presented the song to Miller, he offered it to Andy Fletcher and Martin Gore of Depeche Mode, although the two of them rejected it.

Clarke had written "Only You" as a sentimental ballad, and wanted to find a vocalist who could sing with emotion. Around this time, the rhythm and blues band The Screamin' Ab Dabs split, and singer Alison Moyet placed an ad in Melody Maker looking for a new band. Clarke had heard Moyet perform with a few other bands in the pub circuit, and felt she was a good fit for the song. He responded to the ad and asked Moyet if she was interested in singing for a demo. Moyet was reluctant at first, as she never aspired to perform pop songs, and noted "A part of me was thinking I'll never hear the end of it if I go and sing with this pretty boy". She eventually agreed, saying she needed the money and had no way of making a demo on her own.

Clarke recorded the demo of "Only You" on a four-track tape recorder, and had already finished the backing track when Moyet arrived. Once the demo was finished, Clarke presented it to Miller, who at first found it to be uninteresting. That evening, publishing associates from Scandinavia heard the demo and liked it, which Clarke noted may have influenced Miller's opinion of the song. About a week later, Miller called Clarke and told him that he and Moyet should rerecord the song as a group and release it as a single. Moyet was surprised by the news, as neither she nor Clarke had intended to start a band together. The two knew virtually nothing about each other besides musical abilities, and Moyet described the pairing as "almost like an arranged marriage". Regardless, the newly formed duo recorded "Only You" at Blackwing Studios. Eric Radcliffe produced the song, along with Clarke and Miller.

Composition

"Only You" is a synth-pop song with a tempo of 108 beats per minute. The song features an arpeggio chord progression, and is composed in the key of A major. When asked about the song, Moyet said: "'Only You' has a nursery rhyme simplicity and a lack of pretension. You don't need to be a great instrumentalist to play it. It's a universal, everyman song." Marcos Hassan of Tiny Mix Tapes agreed with this statement. He wrote that although "Only You" is a traditional synth-pop song, its softer and intimate sound is more reminiscent of Motown records, and ultimately described the song as "a warm and familiar extraterrestrial creature". Stewart Mason of AllMusic noted the use of layered melodies performed on multiple monophonic synthesizers, which add what he called "depth and melodic substance" to the song.

Lyrically, "Only You" is a torch song about the resignation of a relationship. The singer knows the conflict laden relationship is over, but desperately wants to be proven wrong. NME's Priva Elan wrote that the song may have initially been about Clarke's uneasy relationship with Depeche Mode, but Moyet turned the lyrics into the story of a person "looking through a scrapbook of photo-like memories". Moyet's soulful, almost masculine vocals span a tonal range of F3 to D4. Mason compared Moyet's vocals to those of 1970s singer Ann Peebles.

Release and reception
"Only You" was released in March 1982, as a 7" and 12" single. It was the first single from their debut album Upstairs at Eric's, and was paired with the B-side "Situation". The cover art for "Only You" featured an illustration of an American football player running with the ball.

"Only You" debuted at number seventy-two on the UK singles chart, on 11 April. Over the next few weeks, the song steadily climbed the chart, and on 16 May peaked at number two, only behind the Eurovision winning song "A Little Peace". "Only You" stayed within the top ten for the next three weeks, after which it began to drop in position. It spent fourteen weeks on the chart, and last appeared on 11 July. During its chart run, "Only You" was certified silver by the British Phonographic Industry, denoting shipments of 250,000 copies.

In the United States, "Only You" debuted at number ninety on the Billboard Hot 100 on 26 February 1983. The song slowly rose in positions, and on 19 March peaked at number sixty-seven, where it remained for three weeks. It spent eight weeks on the chart, and last appeared on 16 April.

The song was ranked at number 7 among the top ten "Tracks of the Year" for 1982 by NME, and in 2012 the website ranked it at number 8 of their Greatest Pop Songs in History list.

Track listing
 7": Mute/7 MUTE 20 (UK)
 "Only You" – 3:10
 "Situation" – 2:22

 7": Sire/9 2-98447 (US)
 "Only You" – 3:10
 "Winter Kills" – 4:01

 12": Mute/12 MUTE 20 (UK)
 "Only You" – 3:10
 "Situation" (extended version) – 5:20

 CD: Mute/CD MUTE 20 (UK)
 "Only You" – 3:10
 "Situation" – 2:26
 "Situation" (extended version) – 5:20
(*) CD released on 30 September 1996

Charts

Weekly charts

Year-end charts

Certifications

Use in film and television
The song features in the films Can't Hardly Wait and The Chocolate War, additional to the closing scenes of the final episode of the British TV series The Office. The song is also heard in the closing scene of The Americans episode "Dimebag", in the closing scene of the Lucifer episode "High School Poppycock", the Once Upon a Time episodes "The Price" and "Dreamcatcher" (and lends its title to the 21st episode of the fifth season), the Fringe episode "Transilience Thought Unifier Model-11", and over the closing scenes and credits of episode 3 of the BBC/Hulu mini-series Normal People. It was also the closing scenes music in the American TV series 9-1-1 episode "What's Next?" broadcast May 11, 2020. And then the closing scenes of episode n°3 of the adult cartoon series 'Little demon'.

The song is a central plot point in the 2012 romantic horror film Jack & Diane.

A cover version of the song by the Norwegian band Flunk is used in the Designated Survivor episode "Line of Fire".

A cover of the song by Jonah Mutono was included on the Love, Victor season three soundtrack, which was released on June 15, 2022.

The Flying Pickets version was used in a montage about the 2022 FIFA World Cup during the 2022 BBC Sports Personality of the Year awards ceremony at Dock10 Studios at MediaCityUK in Salford, United Kingdom.

Cover versions

The Flying Pickets version

An a cappella version by the Flying Pickets was even more successful than the 1982 original on the UK Singles Chart, being released towards the end of the following year and becoming the Christmas number one in 1983. It spent five weeks at the top. This made "Only You" the first a cappella chart-topper in the UK. The song was also the 1983 Christmas number one in Ireland. It was released on overseas markets the following year.

The Flying Pickets version went on to become a number one hit on the West German Singles Chart in 1984, and also charted in Canada, though it did not chart in the United States. The song is also used at the end of Wong Kar-wai's 1995 film Fallen Angels.

The Flying Pickets version was reportedly one of Margaret Thatcher's favourite songs, a fact that has been noted with irony, due to the band's socialist views and support of the 1984–1985 miners' strike which Thatcher opposed.  

Judy Collins did a cover version in her 1984 Home Again album.

Track listing
 7" single 10,106,103 (1983)
 7" single 10 TEN 14 (1983)
 "Only You" – 3:20
 "Disco Down" – 3:27

Charts

Enrique Iglesias version

Spanish singer-songwriter Enrique Iglesias recorded a Spanish version of the song, which was featured on his second studio album Vivir (1997), released by Fonovisa on 17 February 1997 (see 1997 in music). The track was released as the second single from the album and debuted at number one on the U.S. Billboard Hot Latin Tracks chart on 3 May 1997 (his second in a row, and the first artist to do so), and spent ten non-consecutive weeks at the top. Iglesias also recorded the song in English, which is included on the album Bailamos Greatest Hits (1999).

Track listing
Only You (English) 3:30
Solo En Ti (Spanish) 3:29
Solo En Ti /Only You (Spanglish) 3:30

Charts

Kylie Minogue version

"Only You" is the lead single from Kylie Minogue's 2015 album, Kylie Christmas. Minogue and James Corden (who have been friends since 2009) reportedly saw the duet as a novelty inclusion for the album. However, it was elevated to single status.

Charts

Release history

Selena Gomez version

A cover version performed by Selena Gomez was included on the soundtrack for 13 Reasons Why (2017), a series adaptation of the eponymous book. Its official lyric video was uploaded to Gomez's Vevo account on 18 April 2017.

Charts

See also
List of number-one singles (UK)
List of number-one Billboard Hot Latin Tracks of 1997
List of Christmas number one singles (UK)

References

1982 songs
1982 debut singles
1980s ballads
Yazoo (band) songs
Songs written by Vince Clarke
Song recordings produced by Eric Radcliffe
Song recordings produced by Daniel Miller
1983 debut singles
The Flying Pickets songs
UK Singles Chart number-one singles
Number-one singles in Germany
Irish Singles Chart number-one singles
1997 singles
2015 singles
Enrique Iglesias songs
Kylie Minogue songs
James Corden songs
Selena Gomez songs
Mute Records singles
Virgin Records singles
Fonovisa Records singles
Parlophone singles
New wave ballads
Synth-pop ballads
Christmas number-one singles in the United Kingdom
UK Independent Singles Chart number-one singles